Christine E. Canavan is a former American state legislator who served in the Massachusetts House of Representatives from 1993 to 2015. She was the state representative for the 10th Plymouth District, which consists of West Bridgewater, Ward 4, Precincts B&C; Ward 5, Precincts B, C & D; and all of Ward 6 of Brockton, Precinct 3 of Easton, and Precinct 1 of East Bridgewater. She declined to seek re-election in 2014.

Early life and career
Canavan graduated from Massasoit Community College in 1983 with an Associate degree in nursing. In 1988, Canavan received a Bachelor's degree in nursing from University of Massachusetts, Boston. She was employed as a registered nurse prior to becoming a legislator.

Political career
Before becoming a state legislator, Canavan served for three years on the Brockton school committee.  Canavan was first elected to the Massachusetts House of Representatives in 1993. She has been re-elected every time since her first campaign. In many years, Canavan has not faced a primary or general election opponent. In 2010, she faced her most difficult reelection campaign in many years, defeating Matt Albanese in the primary with 52% of the vote, and defeating John Cruz of West Bridgewater in the general election with 53% of the vote.

As a state representative, Canavan serves on the Joint Committee on Economic Development and Emerging Technologies, the Joint Committee on Housing, the Joint Committee on Public Health, the Joint Committee on Ways and Means, and the House Committee on Ways and Means. Creedon's voting record in the house has been consistently high in recent years, with the exception of 2011, when she spent the beginning of the year recovering from a broken leg.

When a bill was before the House regarding the placement of a ballot question that called for banning gay marriage, Canavan initially voted yes for the bill, but changed her position by voting against an amendment later on that essentially killed the bill. Canavan voted in favor of casino gaming in a 2011 vote. She has publicly stated that she has reservations about the cost of a south coast commuter rail extension, but would support such a project if environmental concerns are taken care of.

Canavan announced in January 2014 that she would not seek re-election when her term expired in 2015; also indicated a desire to study and become a Methodist minister.

Electoral history

2010

2004

External links
Massachusetts General Court Member Profile
Campaign Website

References

American nurses
American women nurses
Living people
1950 births
Democratic Party members of the Massachusetts House of Representatives
Politicians from Boston
Massasoit Community College alumni
University of Massachusetts Boston alumni
Women state legislators in Massachusetts
21st-century American women